First Love is 2010 Nepali romantic movie directed by Simosh Sunuwar starring Aaryan Sigdel, Reecha Sharma, Nisha Adhikari, Karma and Binaya . It is the love story roaming between three close friends two girls.

Cast

Nisha Adhikari as Aabha
Reecha Sharma as Neetu) 
Aaryan Sigdel as AAyush
Karma Shakya as Gaurav
Vinay Shrestha as Rohan
Namrata Shrestha in Guest Appearance as an RJ.

References

External links
 

2010 films
Nepalese romantic drama films